Rio Negro is a municipality in the state of Paraná in the South Region of Brazil.

Climate 
The climate is highlands subtropical but with precipitation distributed during the year and therefore can be classified as Cfb (according with Köppen classification), commonly referred to as oceanic climate. Share features with plateau areas of Paraná and the other states of southern Brazil. The summers are warm and occasionally hot and the winters are cold by Brazilian standards, although short and mild in general. The rainfall is well distributed over 60 mm in the dry month, totaling a total of 1419 mm typical for this climatic category. Snow is rare, but more conducive than Curitiba, for example.

See also
List of municipalities in Paraná

References

Municipalities in Paraná